Seah is a surname in various cultures. Its languages of origin include Chinese and Muscogee.

Origins
Seah may be a Latin-alphabet spelling of multiple Chinese surnames, based on their pronunciation in various Southern Min dialects, listed in the table below. Southern Min spellings of Chinese surnames are often found in Malaysia and Singapore, where many descendants of Chinese migrants can trace their roots to the Fujian and Guangdong provinces of China where various Southern Min dialects are spoken.

Seah may also be name in other cultures as well. For example, it was a Muscogee name, more commonly spelled Sioh.

Statistics

The 2010 United States Census found 170 people with the surname Seah, making it the 105,079th-most-common name in the country. This represented an increase from 133 (120,330th-most-common) in the 2000 Census. In both censuses, more than eight-tenths of the bearers of the surname identified as Asian, and roughly one tenth as non-Hispanic White.

People

Chinese surname Xiè (謝)
Seah Mong Hee, Singaporean quantity surveyor who became a partner of Langdon & Seah in 1949
Seah Kian Peng (born 1961), Singaporean politician
Jade Seah (born 1983), Singaporean model
Stella Seah (born 1992), Singaporean singer-songwriter

Chinese surname Shé (佘)
Seah Eu Chin (1805–1833), Chinese-born Singaporean merchant
Seah Tee Heng (died 1884), Kapitan Cina in Johor, Malaya
Seah Leng Chye, son of Seah Tee Heng
Seah Jim Quee, businessman in Johor, Malaya
Lynnette Seah (born 1957), Singaporean violinist
Nicole Seah (born 1986), Singaporean politician

Other
Sunday Seah (born 1978), Liberian football goalkeeper

References

Multiple Chinese surnames